The second government formed by Prime Minister Asadollah Alam was inaugurated on 19 February 1963. It replaced the first government of Alam which ended on 18 February when he submitted his resignation to the Shah Mohammad Reza Pahlavi. The cabinet lasted for nearly thirteen months until March 1964 when Asadollah Alam resigned from the office. It was succeeded by the cabinet of Hassan Ali Mansur.

List of ministers
The cabinet was consisted of the following sixteen members:

Reshuffles and next cabinet
Minister of Agriculture Hasan Arsanjani resigned from the office on 9 March 1963 and was replaced by Ismail Riahi. In fact, Arsanjani was forced to resign from the office and was appointed ambassador to Italy immediately after his resignation. 

Six cabinet members were appointed to the incoming cabinet of Hassan Ali Mansour.

References

External links

1963 establishments in Iran
1964 disestablishments in Iran
Cabinets of Iran
Cabinets established in 1963
Cabinets disestablished in 1964